Muhammad Ibrahim Khan Khattak is a Pakistani politician who was a member of the Provincial Assembly of Khyber Pakhtunkhwa.

Political career
Khattak was elected to the Provincial Assembly of Khyber Pakhtunkhwa as a candidate of Pakistan Tehreek-e-Insaf (PTI) from the constituency PK-61 in 2018 Pakistani by-elections held on 14 October 2018. Now he is serving as a Parliamentary Secretary Of Relief Department KPK. He defeated Noor Alam Khan of Awami National Party (ANP). Khattak garnered 14,557 votes while his closest rival secured 9,282 votes.

References

Living people
Pakistan Tehreek-e-Insaf politicians
Politicians from Khyber Pakhtunkhwa
Year of birth missing (living people)